Mokotakan is an open-air museum located in Saint-Mathieu-du-Parc in the Mauricie region of Quebec, Canada. It traces the presence of aboriginal peoples in Quebec for more than 5000 years.  The eleven aboriginal peoples of Quebec represented at the site are Abenakis, Algonquins, Atikamekws, Cree, Wendat, Innu (Montagnais), Inuit, Maliseet, Micmac, Mohawk, Naskapis.  The interpretive village was constructed based on various buildings recovered from various sites from the eleven nations.

The mission of this site is the sharing, dissemination and interpretation of culture of indigenous peoples of the Americas, with emphasis on the eleven nations of Quebec.  A guided tour teaches visitors lifestyles, culture, history and spirituality of these peoples.

Mōkotākan means "crooked knife" in Atikamekw, an indispensable tool of the eleven nations of Quebec.

Image gallery

Affiliations
The Museum is affiliated with: CMA,  CHIN, and Virtual Museum of Canada.

See also
 Aboriginal peoples in Quebec
 First Nations

References

External links

 Mokotakan official website

Abenaki culture
Algonquin
Atikamekw
Cree culture
Wyandot
Innu culture
Inuit in Quebec
Maliseet
Mi'kmaq in Canada
Mohawk culture
Naskapi
Museums in Mauricie
First Nations history in Quebec
First Nations museums in Canada
Open-air museums in Canada
History museums in Quebec